The following is a list of compositions by Russian composer, Modest Mussorgsky.

Combined sortable list

This is a sortable list. Press the button next to the criterion you would like to use to sort the list. The default sort order may be restored by refreshing your browser.

Note: The publication date is the first known date of publication, regardless of edition or fidelity to the composer's original score.

Detailed list by category

Operas

Orchestral works

Piano works

Choral works

Songs

Youthful Years

Youthful Years: A Collection of Romances and Songs is a bound series of 18 manuscripts of songs by Mussorgsky, the existence of which was announced by Charles Malherbe in 1909.
 "Where Art Thou, Little Star?"
 "The Joyous Hour"
 "The Leaves Rustled Sadly"
 "Many Are My Palaces and Gardens"
 "A Prayer"
 "Tell Me Why, Gentle Maiden"
 "What Are Words of Love to You?"
 "The Winds Blow, Wild Wind"
 "But If I Could Meet With Thee"
 "Little One"
 "Old Man's Song"
 "King Saul"
 "Night"
 "Kalistrat"
 "The Outcast"
 "Sleep, Go to Sleep, Peasant Son"
 "Song of the Balearic Islander"
 "Every Saturday"

Opus numbers

Michel-Dimitri Calvocoressi provides this list of works with opus numbers, compiled by the composer, prefaced by the following remarks (italics added): "The other catalogue which was sent to Stassof is dated 16 August 1878; but, as it mentions no work composed later than 1874, Andrei Rimsky-Korsakof suggests, rightly, that it must have been compiled some four years earlier. Its only value is that of a biographical curiosity."

Note: The columns 'category' and 'notes', as well as the column headings, have been added for the convenience of the reader. It will be noticed that Calvocoressi's date given in the preceding remarks (16 August 1878) does not match that given below.

References
Notes

Sources
Abraham, G., "Modest Musorgsky" in The New Grove: Russian Masters 1, New York: W. W. Norton & Co. (1986)
Calvocoressi, M.D., Abraham, G., Mussorgsky, 'Master Musicians' Series, London: J.M.Dent & Sons, Ltd., 1946
Calvocoressi, M. D., Modest Mussorgsky: His Life and Works, London: Rockliff, 1956
Gordeyeva, Ye. (editor), Kazakova, N. (works list) M. P. Musorgskiy: Letters, 2nd edition, Moscow: Music (publisher), 1984 [Гордеева, Е., М. П. Мусоргский: Письма, Москва: Музыка, 1984]
Taruskin, R., Musorgsky: Eight Essays and an Epilogue, New Jersey: Princeton University Press, 1993
 Unknown compiler, notes to Moussorgsky: Integrale des Melodies CD recording by Boris Christoff, EMI Records Ltd, 1989

 
Lists of piano compositions by composer
Piano compositions by Russian composers
Lists of compositions by composer